Go! Younha is the first official album by pop/rock singer Younha, released on October 5, 2005. The album title is a pun on her Korean name, 고윤하 (Go Yoon-ha).

Track listing
Houkiboshi - Album Mix Version (ほうき星 - Album Mix Version)
Motto Futari de (もっとふたりで)
Orenji no Hatsukoi (オレンジの初恋)
Aoi Lemon (碧い檸檬)
Yubikiri - Japanese Version (ゆびきり - 日本語version)
Himawari (向日葵)
My Lover (マイ☆ラバ)
Yume no Tsuzuki - Album Version (夢の続き - Album Version)
Ashita, Tenki ni Nare (あした、天気になれ)
Aiaigasa (相合傘)
Negai wa Hitotsu (願いはひとつ)
Omoide ni Dekinai (思い出にできない)
Touch (タッチ)

2005 albums
Younha albums
Sony Music Entertainment Japan albums